Puyang may refer to: 

Puyang, a municipality in Henan Province, China
Puyang County, a county containing the municipality of Puyang, Henan, China
Puyang River, a river in Zhejiang Province, China